Captain Butler is a British sitcom starring Craig Charles as Butler, the captain of a motley crew of pirates which included Roger Griffiths, Shaun Curry, Lewis Rae, and Sanjeev Bhaskar. Created by John Smith and Rob Sprackling, the series ran for only six episodes on Channel 4 in 1997. Its theme tune was the Sex Pistols version of "Friggin' In The Riggin'" (with minor variations by the actors within the series).

Plot
The series is set during the 18th century, sometime between the period known as the 'Golden Age of Piracy' and the Napoleonic Wars, and follows the adventures of a misfit band of pirates led by Captain Butler (Craig Charles). However, the setting intentionally introduces historical anachronisms, as both Blackbeard and Admiral Horatio Nelson are portrayed in the series, and it is difficult to determine the specific time period.

Characters
Captain Butler (Craig Charles)
Cliff (Roger Griffiths)
Bosun (Shaun Curry)
Roger (Lewis Rae)
Adeel (Sanjeev Bhaskar)

Episodes

External links

Captain Butler at TV Timewarp

Channel 4 sitcoms
1990s British sitcoms
1997 British television series debuts
1997 British television series endings
Television series about pirates